Gregson is a surname.

People
Alf Gregson (1889–1968), English footballer
Edward Gregson (born 1945), English composer
John Gregson (1919–1975), English actor
Joseph Gelson Gregson (1835–1909), a Baptist preacher from England who worked with British Indian Army
Matthew Gregson (1749–1824), English antiquary
 Michael Craig (actor) (born Michael Francis Gregson, 1929), English actor and screenwriter
 Natasha Gregson Wagner (1970) American actress
Randy Gregson (c. 1919 – 2010), American tennis player and official
 Richard Gregson (1930-2019), English film producer and screenwriter 
Thomas Gregson (1798–1874), Premier of Tasmania
William Gregson (slave trader) (1721–1800), English slave trader and Lord Mayor of Liverpool
William Gregson (barrister) (1790–1863), English barrister and Home Office under-secretary
William Gregson (cricketer) (1877–1963), Scottish cricketer

Fictional characters
Michael Gregson, a character in the show Downton Abbey
Inspector Tobias Gregson, a minor character in the Sherlock Holmes stories by Arthur Conan Doyle
Captain Thomas "Tommy" Gregson, a character in the show Elementary

English-language surnames
Patronymic surnames
Surnames from given names